The Iglesia de El Salvador is a church in Toledo, Spain completed in 1159.

Although the church is small, it is an exceptional building, because it was the site of 4 successive constructions, one on other and so on. It's a 12th-century church built on an 11th-century Taifa mosque, which was an expansion of a 9th-century Umayyad mosque and in turn on a Visigothic religious building.

The current church is still oriented south-east, in the direction of Mecca. It survived the conquest of Toledo by the Christian armies in 1085, to be turned into a church in 1159. One of the most characteristic elements of the church is a Visigothic pilaster, with intricate relief carvings.

History 

The Iglesia de El Salvador is located in the city of Toledo, near the Churches of Santo Tomé and Convento de Santa Úrsula. It is one of the churches mentioned in the Lazarillo de Tormes, and here Joanna of Castile ("the Mad") and the dramatist Francisco de Rojas Zorrilla were baptized.

The current church is built on the mosque, so it is oriented southeast in direction toward Mecca. For which construction, different elements of the previous Visigothic building were reused, because of that a horseshoe arcade supported on Visigothic pilasters has been preserved with sculpted decoration of figurative themes, unusual in this type of remains. The Pilaster of El Salvador, shows in one of its faces various Visigothic miraculous scenes from the life of Jesus: the Cure of the Blind, the Resurrection of Lazarus, the Samaritan and the Hemorroísa, as well as other themes of eucharistic hue that alluding to Christ as the salvation. Its crude treatment shows the abandonment in which the work had fallen on the stone.

Although it conserves the shape of the minaret, that carries incrustations of borders, in 1159 it made several Christian modifications, and the construction in the end-15th century of the Gothic chapel of Santa Catalina. The tower corresponds to the minaret of the mosque, with a Baroque brick addition at the body of the bells.

It is dedicated to St. Savior. The church suffered a fire in the 15th century, which forced an important restoration. Álvarez de Toledo was commissioned to the restoration and he added new chapels highlighting the chapel of Santa Catalina.

References

Matilde Revuelta Tubino, Inventario Artistico de Toledo (Madrid, 1983–89)  p. 307

Bibliography

External links

 Description of the Iglesia de El Salvador in toledomonumental.com
 The Iglesia de El Salvador in Toledo olvidado
Consorcio Toledo: La Mezquita de el Salvador  (retrieved December 13, 2008)
''ArteHistoria 

Former mosques in Spain
Conversion of non-Christian religious buildings and structures into churches
9th-century mosques
12th-century Roman Catholic church buildings in Spain
Salvador
Visigothic architecture
Moorish architecture in Spain